Heineken Malaysia Berhad (HEINEKEN Malaysia) (MYX: 3255) is a major producer of beer, stout, cider and non-alcoholic malt beverages in Malaysia and has been listed on the Main Board of Bursa Malaysia since 1965. Among the brands they produce and market are Heineken, Tiger Beer, Tiger Crystal, Guinness, Strongbow Apple Ciders, Apple Fox Cider, Anchor Smooth, Kilkenny, Anglia, and Malta. The company also imports and distributes Heineken 0.0, Paulaner and Kirin Ichiban.

History 
Heineken Malaysia Berhad was first incorporated on 24 January 1964 under the name Guinness Malaysia Limited. It has been operating the Sungei Way Brewery which started its operations in 1965. Located in Selangor, the brewery occupies a land area of 23.72 acres (96,000 m2). On 15 April 1966, the name changed to Guinness Malaysia Berhad.

Following the merger of Guinness Malaysia Berhad and Malayan Breweries (Malaya) Sdn Bhd in 1989, a new joint venture company, Guinness Anchor Berhad, was formed. GAPL Pte Ltd served as the holding company whilst Malayan Breweries (Malaya) became a dormant wholly owned subsidiary of the company.

On 7 October 2015, the company announced that Heineken N.V. acquired the remaining shares owned by Diageo Plc in GAPL Pte Ltd. Heineken N.V. controls 100% of GAPL which holds 51% equity interest in Heineken Malaysia Berhad. On 15 March 2016, the company announced its name change from GAB to Heineken Malaysia Berhad effective 21 April 2016, to reflect the corporate identity and branding of the company and its relationship with the Heineken group of companies.

Management structure 

 Board of Directors
 Dato' Sri Idris Jala
 Roland Bala
 Martin Giles Manen
 Datin Ngiam Pick Ngoh, Linda
 Leo Evers
 Yu Yu-Ping
 Lim Rern Ming, Geraldine
 Management Team 
 Roland Bala
 Szilard Voros
 Renuka Indrarajah
 Vasily Baranov
 Pablo Chabot
 Kukarajan (Kuhan) Kanagarajan
 Salima Bekoeva
 Janina Vrieesekoop

Shareholding structure 
The shares of Heineken Malaysia are traded on Bursa Malaysia under the symbols: HEIM. The shareholding in the company's stock is depicted in the table below:

1. 51% of Heineken Malaysia's equity interest is held indirectly by Heineken N.V. via its wholly owned subsidiary, GAPL Pte Ltd.

Brands

Beer 

 Heineken

Heineken is a 5% alcohol by volume (ABV) pale lager that is one of Heineken Malaysia's flagship products. It is brewed using an original recipe since 1873 from three main ingredients: water, malt (barley), and hops. The beer is recognisable for its iconic green bottle and red star.

 Heineken 0.0

Heineken 0.0 is a non-alcoholic malt beverage that was launched in the Netherlands in 2017 and introduced in Malaysia in July 2019. The beverage is double brewed with natural ingredients including water, malted barley, hops and yeast then undergoes a de-alcoholisation process.

 Tiger Beer

Tiger Beer is a 5% ABV Asian lager, first brewed in 1932 by Malayan Breweries Limited in Singapore. Available in over 60 countries worldwide, the lager has won over 50 international awards and accolade.

 Tiger Crystal

A variant of regular Tiger Beer, Tiger Crystal is a light lager with a 4.2% ABV, brewed at -1 °C giving the beverage a low bitterness and refreshing finish. Initially released as a limited-edition beverage in conjunction with the Lunar Year of the Tiger in Malaysia in 2010, the beverage returned in 2019 after proving to be a success across markets in Asia.

 Anchor Smooth

Anchor Smooth was the first lager to be brewed locally in Malaysia in 1933. The lager has a 4.0% ABV, brewed to a smooth blend of aromatic hops.

 Kilkenny

Kilkenny is a 4.0% ABV Irish ale that originated from the city of Kilkenny in Ireland in 1710. The red velvety ale combines the bitterness of hops with the sweetness from the malt along with hints of coffee from the roasted barley. This gives the beverage a mix of fruity, floral and malty aromas.

 Paulaner

Paulaner is a 5.5% ABV German wheat beer that is brewed using a membrane filtration system which ensures a gentle filtration process to produce a clear beer.

 Kirin Ichiban

Kirin Ichiban is a Japanese 100% malt beer with a 5.0% ABV. Available in more than 40 countries, the beer was first introduced in Malaysia in 2014, making it Heineken Malaysia's first Japanese product in its portfolio. The beer is brewed using a “First Press” method where only the first press of malt is extracted to make the beer. This gives the beverage a crisp, rich flavour that leaves an aftertaste.

Stout 

 Guinness

Guinness is a 5.5% ABV stout recognised for its distinct taste and heritage. The beverage sells more than 10 million pints daily worldwide. In 1965, Heineken Malaysia brewed the first Guinness at its Sungei Way Brewery. Heineken Malaysia is a 5-time winner of the “Guinness League of Excellence,” in recognition for being the best brew in the world outside of Dublin.

Cider 

 Strongbow Apple Ciders

Strongbow Apple Ciders is a 4.5% ABV cider sold globally in over 70 countries. Launched in the UK in 1960 by H.P. Bulmer, the beverage uses apples grown and harvested from Herefordshire where the cider is pressed and bottled.

 Apple Fox Cider

Launched in 2017, Apple Fox Cider is a 4.5% ABV New Zealand-inspired cider produced in Heineken Malaysia. Using apples sourced from orchards over the world, this gives the cider a crisp texture and intense flavour.

Other brands in Heineken Malaysia’s portfolio 

 Anglia Shandy

Anglia Shandy is a beverage made of a blend of beer and fizzy lemonade with an ABV of less than 1%.

 Malta

Malta is a lightly carbonated non-alcoholic malt beverage containing high concentrations of vitamins B1, B3 and B6.

Economic Contributions

Taxes 
Heineken Malaysia contributed over RM1.3 billion in taxes to the Malaysian government annually.

Employment/Jobs creation 
As part of the brewing industry, the company contributes to the creation of over 60,000 jobs in Malaysia.

Corporate social responsibility

Sustainability 

 HEINEKEN's Global sustainability strategy - Brewing a Better World (BaBW)

The BaBW supports 10 out of 17 of the United Nations Sustainable Development Goals.

 Value Chain - The company's sustainability strategy covers the entire value chain ‘From Barley to Bar’.

Advocating Responsible Consumption 
Heineken Malaysia promotes their products responsibly, advocating responsible consumption to create a sensible drinking culture through their Drink Sensibly platform.

Community 

 SPARK Foundation

SPARK Foundation is the CSR arm of Heineken Malaysia established in 2007. Most of the company's community programmes are carried out under SPARK Foundation to bring about positive social and environmental change.

 W.A.T.E.R (Working Actively Through Education and Rehabilitation) Project
  English Enrichment Training Programme
 Partnerships

Awards

See also 
 Alcohol in Malaysia
 Beer in Malaysia

References

External links 
 
 Heineken Malaysia Berhad Company Profile on Bloomberg L.P.

Beer in Malaysia
Companies listed on Bursa Malaysia
Malaysian brands
1964 establishments in Malaysia
Heineken brands
Malaysian subsidiaries of foreign companies
Heineken subsidiaries
Food and drink companies of Malaysia
Food and drink companies established in 1964